Eucosmophora eclampsis is a moth of the family Gracillariidae. It is known from Panama.

The length of the forewings is 3.5 mm for females.

References

Acrocercopinae
Moths described in 1914